Ailes or aile may refer to:

People
With this given name
 Ailes Gilmour, pioneer of the American Modern Dance movement of the 1930s
 Aile Asszonyi (born 1975)
Surnamed
 Roger Ailes (1940–2017), president of America's Fox News Channel and chairman of the Fox Television Stations Group
 Stephen Ailes (1912–2001), United States Secretary of the Army between 1964 and 1965
Other people
 Sts'Ailes, First Nations people in the Lower Mainland of the Canadian province of British Columbia

Fictional characters
 Aile (Mega Man ZX character)

Other uses
 Aile Castle, Vevey, Vaud, Switzerland
Les Ailes de la Mode (Les Ailes), a department store chain in the province of Quebec, Canada
 Complexe Les Ailes (Montreal) (Ailes), a shopping mall in downtown Montreal named after Les Ailes de la Mode

See also
 Des racines et des ailes, French television documentary series